Sauni Tongatule is a Niuean politician who currently sits in the Niue assembly.

He was first elected in 2020 where he was a candidate on the common role, which is the single nationwide constituency, where he placed second with 391 votes. Following the election Tongatule was appointed minister for social services and education by the new premier, Dalton Tagelagi.

Prior to entering parliament, Tongatule was the director of the department of the environment.

References 

Members of the Niue Assembly
Niuean civil servants
Niuean people
Social affairs ministers of Niue
Ministers of Education of Niue
Living people
Year of birth missing (living people)